Mendicino is an Italian surname. Notable people with the surname include:

Ettore Mendicino (born 1990), Italian footballer
Gerry Mendicino (born 1950), Canadian actor
Marco Mendicino (born 1973), Canadian politician

Italian-language surnames